Gole Market, is the main commercial and shopping area of Nazimabad, Karachi, Sindh, Pakistan. It is a circular market building so is called Gole (i.e. round in Urdu) market.

It was built in early 1950s just after the independence of Pakistan in 1947, when Nazimabad was established by the government, with plans of expansion of Karachi to settle Muslim refugees in Pakistan. Gole Market is not only famous for fresh food, grocery stores but is also a somewhat known symbol of Nazimabad.

Adjacent Chota Maidan is one of the renowned food streets of Karachi, specially featuring Mumtaz Nihari, Shahbaz Bakery, Abdul Rasheed Qourma & Abi Soaleh Kheer. In 2003, Naimatullah Khan, Mayor of Karachi initiated work on reconstruction of Gole Market at a cost of approximately Rupees 11 million.

In 2008, a World Health Day was observed on 7 April 2008 to highlight the pollution situation near major markets of Karachi including Gole Market.

Parks
 Shalimar Park
 Eid Gah Ground
 Bilal Park
 Family Park
 Farooq Shaheed Park

Religious Institutions
 Jama Masjid, Gole market
 Jama Masjid Noor-e-Islam
 Jama Masjid Ahbab
 Bilal Masjid
 Masjid Ashab-e-Badar 
 Tayaba Masjid
 Amma Ayesha Masjid
 Jama Masjid-o-Imam Bargah-Noor e Iman
 Faizan E Hassaan Masjid

Educational Institutions
 Head office of Hamdard University
 (G.B.S.S.) S.M Public School, Nazimabad
 Sindh Muslim Public Academy Campus 1, 2 & 3
 Government Tameer-e-Nau Boys School
 Government Hussaini School
 Real Angel Secondary School
 Western Grammar School
 Pilot School (For Girls)
 Farha Model School
 Sir Syed Children Academy - Girls Campus 2
 Iqra Madrassa
 Taj Book Stall(Inside Gole Market)

Medical Services
Hawwa medical center
 Zeenat Medical
 Farzana Hospital
 Abbasi Shaheed Hospital
 Nazimabad medical
 Baqai Hospital
 Dr. Ziauddin Maternity Home
 Dr. Ibad ur Rehman (Popularly known as Dr. Ali)
 Dr. Ashar Shahzad
 Dr. Masood Alam Khan
 Dr. Naveed Hussain
 Uzair Clinic
 Dr.(Homeopaethic)Ishrat  
 Azeem Sons Medical Store
 Insaaf Medicos
 Dr Raffat (ENT Specialist)
 Dr. Masroor Clinic
 Chawla Clinic (Burn Department)

Food & Recreation
 Ahbab Sweets
 Anwer Pan Shop
 Asim Allah wala Biryani Center
 Bapu Burger
 Danish store
 Farhan's Sweet Home
 Fayyaz Pan shop
 Fine Bakery
 Ideal Burger
 Irfan Bhai ki Shop
 Ismail Pan Shop
 Israr e shereen
 Late Bagga Pehlwan Paey Cholay Wala (Near KESC Office)
 Muhammad Anees Vegetable Dealer & Exporter
 Real Bakery
 Shandar Pan Shop
 Sohail Sandwich
 Special Dal Kachori Wala (Near Dr. Ziauddin Hospital)
 Star Bakery
 Sultan Food Centre
 Taau French
 Young Snooker Club
 All in One Mart by Hussain Qureshi

Health & Beauty Services
 Samreen Beauty parlor
 Adeel Saloon
 Kaleem multi store
 Groomer Salon
 Akram Salon near KESC office

Other Offices & Landmarks
 Karachi Electric Supply Corporation (KESC) Office
 Galaxy Chowk
 Ansari Studio
 Attractive Computers
 Ahmed & Sons Toys
 Hussain Residency
 HR House
 Taj Book Stall (Alam Bhai ki Dukan) inside gole market since 1956.

Bus routes
Bus - 2K bus routes
Rickshaw and Taxi routes

See also
 Nazimabad
 Liaquatabad
 Meena Bazaar
 Sabzi Mandi
 Empress Market

References

Neighbourhoods of Karachi
Retail markets in Karachi
Buildings and structures in Karachi